
Trakai Historical National Park is a national park in Lithuania. It was designated in 1992 to embrace the historic city of Trakai, some 25 kilometers west of Vilnius, and the forests, lakes, and villages in its environs. The Park has Category II in the classification of the IUCN. It is the only historical national park in Europe. 

The park is included to the UNESCO's Tentative Lists.

Nature 
The parallel chains of hills and ridges formed by the glacier alternate with narrow and deep or wide and flat lake-like ridges. There are 32  lakes in the park. Lakes Galvė,  connect with ducts and form a single system. The largest of the lakes is Lake Galvė with 21 islands (the most famous is ) and the cleanest is  lake.

Of interest are the Kudrionys forest and the Plomėnų and Varnikai wetlands, where many mammals and bird species find refuge. Plomėnų swamp has a large colony of waterfowl and many species of protected plants. Lake  is home to a large colonies of black-headed gulls. The nature of the Varnikai Reserve can be explored on a hiking trail.

The park is famous for the number of sights and it attractive surroundings. There is a hilltop on the north shore of Galvė lake, opening up great views.

Gallery

See also
 List of national parks in the Baltics

References

External links 
 
 Tourism.lt

National parks of Lithuania
Protected areas established in 1992
1992 establishments in Lithuania
Tourist attractions in Vilnius County